Scythris gaboronensis is a moth of the family Scythrididae. It was described by Bengt Å. Bengtsson in 2014. It is found in Botswana.

References

gaboronensis
Moths described in 2014